Circle Track Summer is a 2005 film microbudget action/comedy film about auto racing. It was directed by independent film maker Steve Pallotta and featured an appearance by Brian Lisik. Tom Erickson of WNIR also stars in the movie. The film is considered a "local cult favorite".

Production
At the 2004 debut of Pallotta's film Lake Evermore, Palotta announced his plans to film Circle Track Summer as "a launching pad for a commercial filmmaking career", with plans to have it air on a cable network and eventually be released to home video. Filming occurred over a 14-month period (2005–2006) at the Barberton Raceway in Barberton, Ohio. With most of cast and crew working for free, the film was made on a micro-budget of under $10,000, and was one of the first independent films shot by cinematographer Christopher Parker on the Panasonic DVX100 digital video camera. The film was edited in a room in the director's house and music was provided by musician friends of the director.

Circle Track Summer is Steve Pallotta's third full-length feature, following his first two movies The Forbidden Closet and Lake Evermore. With this project, cinematographer Christopher Parker, takes his production level "up several notches".

The project was shot entirely on location in the Akron, Ohio area, with more than 200 locals involved in the one-year filming. The project's costume design was done by Susie Smith, known for her award-winning work on St. Elsewhere.

The filmed debuted July 29, and had a DVD release by CustomFlix on May 19, 2006.

The film features WNIR radio talk show personalities, Stan Piatt, Maggie Fuller, Tom Erickson, Phil Fergusson, and Bob Earley. The film also includes cameo appearances by Akron Beacon-Journal columnist Bob Dyer, Bob Golic of Saved By the Bell: The College Years with additional cameos by Cuyahoga Falls then-mayor Don Robart and Nina Rawls, wife of Lou Rawls.

Plot
The owner of a failing race track seeks to reverse his fortune by holding a series of promotion events where the cars are driven by women. Becky (JodyMarie Spiech) is a waitress who unknowingly puts her life in danger while attempting to save the family farm. She had rediscovered her lost high-school sweetheart, reporter Scoop Hendrickson (Tony Rio), and must decide whether or not to tell him of what ended their romance. To raise money to save the farm, she and three other financially strapped but voluptuous local girls, Su Shi (Jenna Christie), Tammy Lay (Heather Ley) and Jette Black (Lindsay Robertson), sign up for a new Powder-Puff auto racing event at the Barberton Speedway in hopes of winning cold, hard cash. The promotional catch developed by the track owner is that the women must wear bikinis as they race, and must drive the cars backwards.

Cast

 JodyMarie Spiech as Becky Smith
 Tony Rio as Scoop Hendrickson
 Lindsay Robertson as Jette Black
 Heather Ley as Tammy Lay 
 Jenna Christie as Su Shi
 Tom Jenny as Kooter
 Ruben Ryan as Opossum
 Thor Syvertsen as Bud
 Fig Jankowski as Chain Drive
 Doug Cusit as Uncle Bob
 Roger Samblanet as Uncle Dan
 Phil Skoff as Metal Gate 
 Paul Sherman as Anthony

 Dave Zimmerman as Cookie
 Tami Bowman as Caprice Black
 Barbara Evans as Mary
 Sherman Montgomery Jr. as Anthony
 Jacquelane Nespo as Summer
 Ada Carolina Ortiz as Djanga
 Tom Erickson as Track Announcer
 Richard Rolenz as Rocco
 Tom Rush as Deputy Sheriff
 Rick Montgomery as Hairdresser's ghost
 Steve Pallotta as himself

Release
The film was released on DVD on March 19, 2006, and screened April 14, 2007 at the Akron Independent Film Festival.

Response
Record-Courier offered that the film had both strengths and weaknesses. The reviewer wrote "On the weakness side, there was a little too much going on at times, and as a result, some of the plot and character development got lost in the shuffle. There were a couple of continuity problems, but those weren't enough to jar me out of the movie. Other than that, any perceived faults really are more a matter of individual taste (Lost In Translation it’s not) and tolerance for ethnic jokes, sexual innuendo and nudity. The strengths lie mostly in three things: the willingness of the filmmakers to take a chance by poking fun at every known stereotype of Ohioans, and especially of natives of Barberton; Pallotta’s ability to avoid crossing the fine line between localizing a story by using well-known landmarks or inside jokes and providing free advertising by referring to everything by its full name and location - something natives of an area never do; and the supporting players."

References

External links
 
 Circle Track Summer at the Internet Movie Database
 Circle Track Summer at the AllMovie
 WKSU News

American action comedy films
2005 action comedy films
American independent films
2005 films
American auto racing films
Films shot in Ohio
2005 independent films
2000s English-language films
2000s American films